Grembach Łódź has a professional beach soccer team based in Łódź, Poland.

History 
The team "Grembach" was founded in 1979 in near the Widzew Lodz Stadium, where even today there is an old settlement GREMBACH. Name of the settlement was given by German colonists who settled in the area in the early twentieth century. Grünbach (Polonized on Grinbach) is a "green space".

Euro Winners Cup 2016 squad 

Coach:  Jarosław Jagielski

Honours

Polish competitions 
Ekstraklasa
 Winners: 2008, 2011, 2012, 2013, 2015, 2016

Polish Beach Soccer Cup
 Winners: 2007, 2008, 2009, 2010, 2011, 2012
 Runner-up: 2016

Polish Beach Soccer Supercup
 Winners: 2011, 2015

International competitions 
Mundialito de Clubes
Euro Winners Cup
 Sixth Place: 2013
 1/16: 2014, 2016

External links 
  Owner official site 

Sport in Łódź
Polish beach soccer clubs